Dihydrouridine (abbreviated as D, DHU, or UH2) is a pyrimidine nucleoside which is the result of adding two hydrogen atoms to a uridine, making it a fully saturated pyrimidine ring with no remaining double bonds. D is found in tRNA and rRNA molecules as a nucleoside; the corresponding nucleobase is 5,6-dihydrouracil.

Because it is non-planar, D disturbs the stacking interactions in helices and destabilizes the RNA structure. D also stabilizes the C2’-endo sugar conformation, which is more flexible than the C3’-endo conformation; this effect is propagated to the 5’-neighboring residue. Thus, while pseudouridine and 2’-O-methylations stabilize the local RNA structure, D does the opposite.

The tRNAs of organisms that grow at low temperatures (psychrophiles) have high 5,6-dihydrouridine levels  (40-70% more on average) which provides the necessary local flexibility of the tRNA at or below the freezing point.

References 

Nucleosides
Pyrimidinediones